Aaron James Sorensen (born June 6, 1966) is a Canadian musician, writer, producer, and film director living in Calgary, Alberta.  He has written, produced and directed several films and a mini-series. He is the front man for the alt-country band Aaron James & the Cultivators.

Early life
Sorensen was born in Peace River, Alberta. He played guitar from a young age. Sorensen attended the University of Alberta and the University of Calgary, where he studied acting.

Career
Sorensen worked as a school teacher and economic-development officer at the Woodland Cree First Nation in Alberta. He directed and wrote the script for the feature film Hank Williams First Nation, released in 2005.  He was also the producer and editor.

The film premiered in competition at the American Film Institute's AFIfest in Los Angeles. Sorensen won "Best Director" honors at the 2005 American Indian Film Festival, and "Best Music in a Feature Film" at the 2005 Nashville Film Festival. Sorensen won the 2005 AMPIA award for Best Screenwriter.

In 2006, Hank Williams First Nation was adapted into a mini-series of the same name for Canadian broadcaster APTN. Sorensen wrote, directed and produced the series.

In 2007, he released Cranberry Wind, an album of original Americana/roots songs.

Sorensen moved to Los Angeles, where he studied acting at the Beverly Hills Playhouse, and then to Austin, Texas, where he wrote, directed, produced and edited the 2011 indie comedy film Campus Radio. It follows the adventures of campus radio DJ and indie-rock band manager, Xavier P. Thortenberry, as he tried to find a new the lead singer for his band. The film received limited theatrical release in the US and Canada.

40 Below & Falling, a screenplay written by Sorensen was  released to television in 2016. In 2017 Sorensen finished post–production on a film Get Naked!

Discography

 Cranberry Wind (2007), released under the name Aaron James.

Filmography
 Hank Williams First Nation (2005)
 Campus Radio (2011)
 40 Below & Falling (2016)
 Get Naked! (2017)
 Guitar Lessons (2022)

References

External links

Living people
Film directors from Alberta
21st-century Canadian screenwriters
People from Northern Sunrise County
Canadian country singers
Musicians from Alberta
Canadian male film actors
Canadian emigrants to the United States
1966 births
Canadian male screenwriters
Writers from Alberta